Mirjana Granzov (born 6 January 1980) is a Serbian alpine skier. She competed in the women's slalom at the 1998 Winter Olympics.

References

1980 births
Living people
Serbian female alpine skiers
Olympic alpine skiers of Yugoslavia
Alpine skiers at the 1998 Winter Olympics
Sportspeople from Sarajevo